Thomas Karalogos (born 5 August 1951) is a Greek former water polo player who competed in the 1968 Summer Olympics, in the 1972 Summer Olympics, and in the 1980 Summer Olympics. He played at club level for Greek powerhouse Ethnikos Piraeus.

References

1951 births
Living people
Greek male water polo players
Olympic water polo players of Greece
Water polo players at the 1968 Summer Olympics
Water polo players at the 1972 Summer Olympics
Water polo players at the 1980 Summer Olympics
Ethnikos WPC

Ethnikos Piraeus Water Polo Club players
Water polo players from Piraeus
20th-century Greek people